The Heritage Foundation of Newfoundland and Labrador (HFNL) or Heritage NL is a non-profit Crown corporation of the Government of Newfoundland and Labrador established in 1984 by the Historic Resources Act. Its mandate is to stimulate an understanding of, and an appreciation for, the architectural and intangible cultural heritage of Newfoundland and Labrador. In 2018 HFNL rebranded as Heritage NL for its public-facing work.

Organization
Between 1970 and 2000 Canada lost between 21 and 23 percent of its historic building stock, 21 percent in the larger cities, and 23 percent in smaller rural towns. The rate of loss in rural Newfoundland and Labrador is nearly double the national average. Where possible, HFNL has encouraged the retention of historic buildings, and promoted the adaptive reuse of older structures for commercial and public functions. The economic benefits of historic preservation - such as total job creation and increased income - surpass those of other investments such as new housing or new commercial construction. Given the powerful economic pump-priming effect of historic preservation, public programs to foster preservation can realize sizable economic development gains often at little or no cost to the taxpayer.

The Heritage Foundation also has an educational role and undertakes or sponsors events, publications and other projects designed to promote the value of our built heritage.

Built heritage
The Foundation supports and contributes to the preservation and restoration of buildings of architectural or historical significance. HFNL designates buildings and other structures as Registered Heritage Structures and may provide grants for the purpose of preservation and/or restoration of such structures. It is responsible for the Fisheries Heritage Preservation Program, a small-projects granting program which assists in the conservation of vernacular buildings and fishing stages associated with the historic cod fishery and other fisheries. HFNL is the provincial crown agency responsible for the administration of the Historic Places Initiative, and nominates provincially and municipally designated heritage sites to the Canadian Register of Historic Places.

The Heritage Foundation of Newfoundland and Labrador holds a series of programs, grants, and designations as a means of contributing and preserving the architectural history of the province. Some of these designations include the Registered Heritage Structure Designation, the Registered Heritage Structure Restoration Grants, and the Registered Heritage Structure Maintenance Grants. Those who want to designate, maintain, or promote a historic site can then submit applications to receive these grants.

Registered heritage districts
Registered Heritage Districts are geographical areas that are distinct for reasons of architecture, layout, landscape, or intangible culture. Provincially significant district are made up of coherent collections of structures and spaces that represent historic styles, types, or periods, social or technological development, and/or associations with significant people, events, or themes. There are currently six Registered Heritage Districts:
 Harbour Grace Registered Heritage District, Harbour Grace (1992)
 Tilting Registered Heritage District, Tilting (2003)
 Port Union Registered Heritage District, Port Union (2007)
 Downtown Woody Point Registered Heritage District, Woody Point (2008)
 Cable Avenue Registered Heritage District, Bay Roberts (2013)
 Heart's Content Registered Heritage District, Heart's Content (2013)

Intangible cultural heritage
In 2008 HFNL was chosen to lead and implement the province's Intangible Cultural Heritage Strategy. ICH, or what some call "Living Heritage," encompasses many traditions, practices and customs. These include stories, family events, community gatherings, languages, songs, knowledge of natural spaces, healing traditions, foods, holidays, beliefs and cultural practices. Specific examples of intangible traditions covered by HFNL include Christmas mummering traditions, boat building skills, Aboriginal languages and cultural knowledge, regional dialects, and the expressive culture, values and beliefs of the diverse cultural groups of Newfoundland and Labrador. The mission of this initiative is to safeguard and sustain the ICH of Newfoundland and Labrador for present and future generations, as a vital part of the identities of Newfoundlanders and Labradorians, and as a valuable collection of unique knowledge and customs. This will be achieved through policies that support initiatives that celebrate, record, disseminate and promote our living heritage and help to build bridges between diverse cultural groups within and outside Newfoundland and Labrador 

Preserving ICH is vital to sustaining a community’s innate creativity and sense of identity. Therefore, the Government of Newfoundland and Labrador has included the preservation of ICH as a key initiative in its Provincial Strategic Culture Plan. The success of this initiative will depend on the careful implementation of a well-developed strategy. A Working Group appointed by the Department of Tourism, Culture and Recreation has generated a strategy, gathering input  from various stakeholders, and drawing heavily from discussions at the Intangible Cultural Heritage Forum held in St. John’s in June, 2006. This document, the Provincial Strategic Culture Plan, is used in the continuing process of consultation with heritage groups and other interested groups and individuals across the province. It has been formally adopted by the Board of Directors of the Heritage Foundation of Newfoundland and Labrador.

See also
Canadian Register of Historic Places
History of Newfoundland and Labrador
List of historic places in Newfoundland and Labrador
 Newfoundland and Labrador Heritage at Memorial University of Newfoundland

References

External links
 Heritage Foundation of Newfoundland and Labrador website

Non-profit organizations based in Newfoundland and Labrador
Crown corporations of Newfoundland and Labrador
Heritage sites in Newfoundland and Labrador